Sean Howard Kinney (born May 27, 1966) is an American musician, best known as the drummer and co-founder of the rock band Alice in Chains. Kinney also founded the short-lived supergroup Spys4Darwin, and has collaborated with other artists such as Johnny Cash and Metallica. He played drums for his Alice in Chains bandmate, Jerry Cantrell's first solo album, Boggy Depot (1998). Since 2009, Kinney has been co-owner of the Crocodile club in Seattle. He was a guest drummer on NBC's Late Night with Seth Meyers in September 2018. Kinney has earned nine Grammy Award nominations as a member of Alice in Chains.

Biography 
Sean Howard Kinney was born in Renton, Washington, on May 27, 1966. His father was a police officer and his mother was a city official.

Kinney's interest in music was developed at an early age. He got his first drum kit when he was 5 years old. By the age of 9, he was the drummer for his grandfather's band, The Cross Cats, and was traveling the Northwest playing small venues. Kinney grew up in Renton, where he attended Liberty Senior High School in the Issaquah School District.

Alice in Chains 

Kinney met singer Layne Staley around 1985, when Staley's band Sleze was playing at Alki Beach. Kinney revealed to Guitar Legends magazine that in their first meeting he told Staley that he was cool but his band sucked, and that he should get a different drummer, so Kinney suggested himself. Kinney did not have a phone at the time, so he gave Staley a piece of paper with his girlfriend's number.

Kinney met up with Alice in Chains in 1987, when guitarist Jerry Cantrell wanted to form a new band after his band Diamond Lie broke up, so his roommate Layne Staley gave him the phone number of Kinney's girlfriend, Melinda Starr, so that Cantrell could talk to Kinney and set up a meeting. Kinney and his girlfriend went to the Music Bank in Seattle where Cantrell was living and listened to his demos. Cantrell mentioned that they needed a bass player to jam with them, and he already had someone in mind: Mike Starr, with whom Cantrell had played in a band in Burien called Gypsy Rose. Kinney then mentioned that his girlfriend was actually Starr's sister, and that he had been playing in bands together with Starr since they were kids. Kinney called Starr and a few days later he started jamming with him and Cantrell at the Music Bank, but they didn't have a singer. Cantrell, Starr and Kinney wanted Staley to be their lead singer, so they started auditioning terrible lead singers in front of Staley to send a hint. The last straw for Staley was when they auditioned a male stripper – he decided to join the band after that. Starr was replaced by former Ozzy Osbourne bassist Mike Inez in 1993.

Kinney almost didn't play on Alice in Chains' debut album, Facelift. He had broken his hand and the band started rehearsing with Greg Gilmore, the drummer from Mother Love Bone. Kinney explained in the 2009 book Grunge is Dead:

Since the band's inception, Kinney has been the only drummer. He also played piano and sang chorus vocals through a megaphone on the hidden song from Sap entitled "Love Song". The album was named after a dream Kinney had about the band recording some light acoustic songs for an album they name Sap, because it's "sappy.".

Kinney was featured in the 1992 movie Singles, along with the other members of Alice in Chains performing the songs "It Ain't Like That" and "Would?".

Other projects 

In 1996, Kinney joined singer Johnny Cash, guitarist Kim Thayil of Soundgarden, and bassist Krist Novoselic of Nirvana for a cover of Willie Nelson's "Time of the Preacher", featured on the tribute album Twisted Willie, which also had Kinney playing drums for Jerry Cantrell's cover of "I've Seen All This World I Care to See". In the same year, Kinney played drums for Cantrell's first original solo song, "Leave Me Alone", featured on the soundtrack of the 1996 film The Cable Guy.

In 1998, Kinney played drums for Cantrell's first solo album, Boggy Depot, and percussion in the song "Tuesday's Gone", a cover of Lynyrd Skynyrd released on Metallica's 1998 album Garage Inc., also featuring Cantrell on guitar.

After they toured as part of Cantrell's solo band in 1998, Kinney and Queensrÿche guitarist Chris DeGarmo formed a new band called Spys4Darwin in 1999. Alice in Chains' bassist Mike Inez and Sponge lead vocalist Vin Dombroski joined the band soon after. The band released their first and only album on May 18, 2001, a 6-track EP entitled Microfish, and made their live debut at Endfest in Seattle on August 4, 2001.

Since 2009, Kinney co-owns the club The Crocodile in Seattle along with Alice in Chains' manager Susan Silver, Capitol Hill Block Party co-founder Marcus Charles, Peggy Curtis, and Portugal. The Man guitarist Eric Howk. In 2013, Rolling Stone named The Crocodile as one of the best clubs in America, ranked at #7.

Soundgarden lead vocalist Chris Cornell personally asked Kinney to join him, Pearl Jam guitarist Mike McCready, Soundgarden drummer Matt Cameron, Screaming Trees drummer Barrett Martin and Guns N' Roses bassist Duff McKagan in the tribute show to the band Mad Season at Seattle's Benaroya Hall on January 30, 2015. Kinney played bongo for the song "All Alone" while a track with Layne Staley's original vocals were played. The performance was released as a live album in August 2015, entitled Mad Season / Seattle Symphony: Sonic Evolution / January 30, 2015 / Benaroya Hall.

From September 17 to 20, 2018, Kinney was a guest drummer on NBC's Late Night with Seth Meyers.

Alice in Chains rebirth (2005–present) 

Alice in Chains was inactive from 1996 onwards due to Layne Staley's drug issues, which resulted in his death in April 2002. In 2005, Kinney came up with the idea of reuniting with the other two surviving members of Alice in Chains, Jerry Cantrell and Mike Inez, to perform at a benefit concert for the victims of the tsunami disaster that struck South Asia in 2004. Kinney made calls to his former bandmates, as well as friends in the music community, such as former Alice in Chains manager Susan Silver. Kinney was surprised by the enthusiastic response to his idea, and the band performed for the first time in 10 years at the K-Rock Tsunami Continued Care Relief Concert in Seattle on February 18, 2006, featuring guest vocalists singing Staley's parts.

On March 6, 2006, the band performed together again at VH1's Decades Rock Live concert, honoring fellow Seattle musicians Ann Wilson and Nancy Wilson of Heart. That night they played "Rooster" with Comes with the Fall vocalist William DuVall and Ann Wilson. DuVall joined Alice in Chains as lead singer shortly thereafter. The band has toured extensively worldwide since then.

The album Black Gives Way to Blue, the first without Staley, was released on September 29, 2009, featuring DuVall as the new vocalist. The album was totally funded by Kinney and Cantrell, as the band did not have a record label at the time. Their fifth studio album, The Devil Put Dinosaurs Here, was released on May 28, 2013.

In 2013, Kinney added the initials "LSMS" on his drum kit, a tribute to Alice in Chains' late members Layne Staley and Mike Starr.

Alice in Chains' sixth studio album (and the third with DuVall), Rainier Fog, was released on August 24, 2018.

Artwork 
Kinney plays a large role in the presentation of the band, having helped design artwork, T-shirts and stage setups for most of the band's albums and tours.

In 1995, Alice in Chains was contemplating making a third studio album. When it was official, Kinney drew out artwork for the cover and liner notes. The cover features a three-legged dog, reason being, according to band lore, there was a three-legged dog named Tripod that used to terrorize Kinney and chase him around during his paper-work duty when he was a kid. The music video for the album's first single, "Grind", shows a three legged dog (similar to the one that allegedly used to chase Kinney) walking up a stairway with an elderly man.

The cover art of Black Gives Way to Blue (2009), an illustration of a heart surrounded by a black background, was Kinney's basic concept.

Gear 

Kinney uses a drum kit made by Drum Workshop (DW Drums) with Remo heads and cymbals by Sabian. He uses Vater Percussion drumsticks.

Discography 
 Alice in Chains

 Other appearances

Guest appearances

Filmography

References

External links 

1966 births
Living people
Alice in Chains members
Alternative rock drummers
American alternative rock musicians
American heavy metal drummers
Grunge musicians
Musicians from Washington (state)
People from Renton, Washington
Alternative metal musicians
20th-century American drummers
American male drummers
Spys4Darwin members
Businesspeople from Seattle